Felipe Sánchez Roman (1850 in Valladolid, Spain – 1916 in Madrid, Spain) was a  Spanish lawyer and politician, Minister of State in 1905, during the reign of Alfonso XIII. Professor of Civil Law in the University of Granada, Sánchez Román represented the late in the Spanish Senate from 1893 to 1902.

He was the father of the jurist Felipe Sánchez Román y Gallifa.

Sources
Personal dossier of D. Felipe Sánchez Román. Spanish Senate

1850 births
1916 deaths
People from Valladolid
Liberal Party (Spain, 1880) politicians
Foreign ministers of Spain
Members of the Senate of Spain
19th-century Spanish lawyers
Academic staff of the University of Granada